The Xiamen–Chengdu Expressway, designated as G76 and commonly referred to as the Xiarong Expressway is an expressway in China that connects the cities of Xiamen, Fujian, and Chengdu, Sichuan. When complete, it will be  in length.

Route

Fujian

Jiangxi

Hunan

Guangxi

Guizhou
The portion of the expressway connecting the cities of Guiyang and Bijie is referred to as the Guibi Expressway. The portion of the expressway connecting the city of Liupanshui to the Huangguoshu Waterfall is called the Liuhuang Expressway.

Sichuan

References

Chinese national-level expressways
Expressways in Fujian
Expressways in Jiangxi
Expressways in Hunan
Expressways in Guangxi
Expressways in Guizhou
Expressways in Sichuan